November to Remember (commonly abbreviated to N2R) was a professional wrestling event produced by Extreme Championship Wrestling (ECW). It was held during the month of November from 1993 to 2000. Starting with the 1997 edition the event was broadcast on pay-per-view (PPV). The event was considered to be ECW's flagship supercard. The rights to the event now belong to World Wrestling Entertainment (WWE).

Dates, venues and main events

References

 
Recurring events established in 1993
Recurring events disestablished in 2000